Kaanu Nelson Olaniyi (born March 27, 1998 - Riddes, Switzerland) is a Swiss professional basketball player who plays for BC Boncourt since 2018 of the Swiss Basketball League.

Career
In 2013, Olaniyi moved from Switzerland to France to join first division club ES Chalon where he got trained in the youth movement.

In the summer of 2017/2018 season, Olaniyi returned to Switzerland and joined the Swiss Basketball League team Union Neuchâtel.

In the 2018/2019 season, he joined BC Boncourt to participate in the Swiss Basketball League regular season. In 2020, Olaniyi presented himself to the draft, but went undrafted.

National team career 
Olaniyi was a member of the Swiss national U20 team at the 2014 European Championship (Division B). In 2017, he was selected for the first time by the Senior Men's National Team.

References

External links
 FIBA profile

1998 births
Living people
People from Martigny District
Swiss men's basketball players
Swiss people of Nigerian descent
Sportspeople from Valais